Staminodianthus is a genus of trees (family Fabaceae) found in South America. A dichotomous key for the species is available.

References

Leptolobieae
Fabaceae genera